German submarine U-645 was a Type VIIC U-boat built for Nazi Germany's Kriegsmarine for service during World War II.
She was laid down on 17 December 1941 by Blohm & Voss, Hamburg as yard number 621, launched on 3 September 1942 and commissioned on 22 October 1942 under Leutnant zur See Otto Ferro.

Design
German Type VIIC submarines were preceded by the shorter Type VIIB submarines. U-645 had a displacement of  when at the surface and  while submerged. She had two shafts and two  propellers.

U-645 was fitted with five  torpedo tubes (four fitted at the bow and one at the stern), fourteen torpedoes, one  SK C/35 naval gun, 220 rounds, and one twin  C/30 anti-aircraft gun. The boat had a complement of between forty-four and sixty.

Service history
This boat's career began with training at 5th U-boat Flotilla on 22 October 1942, followed by active service on 1 May 1943 as part of the 3rd Flotilla for the remainder of her service.

Wolfpacks
U-645 took part in eight wolfpacks, namely:
 Without name (5–10 May 1943)
 Isar (10 – 15 May 1943)
 Donau 1 (15 – 26 May 1943)
 Leuthen (15 – 24 September 1943)
 Rossbach (24 September – 9 October 1943)
 Coronel 2 (13 – 14 December 1943)
 Coronel 3 (14 – 17 December 1943)
 Borkum (18 – 24 December 1943)

Fate
U-645 has been missing since 12 December 1943 in the North Atlantic northwest of Spain.

Previously recorded fate
All hands were lost.

Summary of raiding history

References

Bibliography

External links

German Type VIIC submarines
1942 ships
U-boats commissioned in 1942
Ships lost with all hands
U-boats sunk in 1943
U-boats sunk by depth charges
U-boats sunk by US warships
Missing U-boats of World War II
World War II shipwrecks in the Atlantic Ocean
World War II submarines of Germany
Ships built in Hamburg
Maritime incidents in December 1943